Knud Merrild Nielsen (10 May 1894 – 31 December 1954) was a Danish painter, sculptor and ceramicist.

Life
Merrild was born in Selling, Ødum parish, in Favrskov Municipality. He worked in ceramics with the potter G. A. Eifrig at the Københavns Lervarefabrik in Valby. He was part of the circle around the avant-garde art magazine Klingen and was a friend of Vilhelm Lundstrøm. In 1921 he emigrated to the United States, where he lived in many different places, including with D.H. Lawrence in Taos, New Mexico, from 1922 to 1923, and was also a friend of the American writer Henry Miller. He later wrote about both of them. Merrild eventually settled in Los Angeles in 1927, where he remained until he returned to Denmark in 1954. He died in Copenhagen in the same year.

He submitted work for the art competitions at the 1924 Summer Olympics and the 1932 Summer Olympics.

Written works
 A Poet and Two Painters: a Memoir of D.H. Lawrence, George Routledge, London, 1938
 With D.H. Lawrence in New Mexico. A Memoir of D.H. Lawrence, Routledge & Kegan Paul Ltd., London, 1964 (reissue of the 1938 book)
 All the Animals in the Zoo - about Henry Miller, Village Press 1973 (originally published in California in 1945 as part of wider collection of artists' reminiscences about Miller)

References

Further reading
 En Kunstner er dod, Ernst Mentze, Beringske tidende 6 Jan 1955
 Henry Miller, 1979: Knud Merrild - A Holiday in Paint, Norwood Editions
 En maler og to forfattere: Knud Merrild - om D.H. Lawrence og Henry Miller, John T. Lauridsen I, Magasin fra Det kongelige Bibliotek, Aarg. 30, nr. 1 (2017) 
 Knud Merrild 1894-1954, Paintings, Constructions, Collages, Watercolors and Drawings. Lytton Gallery, Los Angeles County Museum of Art. November 26-December 26, 1965; Jules Langsner; William Osmun
 Turning the Tide: Early Los Angeles Modernists, 1920-1956, exhibition catalogue, Karlstrom, Paul J., and Ehrlich, Susan; curated by Susan Ehrlich and Barry M. Heisler; Santa Barbara Museum of Art, Santa Barbara, CA, 1990, 
 Knud Merrild - Works from the 1930s and 1940s, 27 Sep-16 Nov 1991, exhibition catalogue with essay by Victoria Dailey, Steve Turner Gallery, Los Angeles
 Knud Merrild: State of Flux, exhibition catalogue, by Victoria Dailey with intro by Edward Ruscha; Beverly Hills: Steve Turner Gallery, 
 Knud Merrild, catalogue of exhibition 3 Nov to 20 Dec 2008, ed. Marshall N Price, Valerie Carbery Gallery, Chicago

External links
Invaluable.com: selection of Merrild's works, with images

1894 births
1954 deaths
19th-century Danish painters
20th-century Danish painters
Danish male painters
Danish sculptors
Danish potters
Olympic competitors in art competitions
19th-century Danish male artists
20th-century Danish male artists